Christine Marie Erickson ( Vinatieri; born January 29, 1978) is an American politician. A member of the  Republican Party, she has been an at-large member of the Sioux Falls City Council since 2014. She was previously a member of the South Dakota House of Representatives, representing District 11 from 2013 to 2014.

Education
Erickson earned her associate degree in business administration from National American University and her bachelor's degree in business management from the University of Sioux Falls.

Elections
In 2012, when incumbent Republican Representative Lora Hubbel ran for South Dakota Senate and left a District 11 seat open, Erickson ran in the four-way June 5, 2012 Republican Primary and placed first with 539 votes (31.2%) ahead of incumbent Representative Mark Willadsen; in the four-way November 6, 2012 General election, Erickson took the first seat with 5,685 votes (30.93%) and fellow Republican nominee Jim Stalzer took the second seat ahead of Democratic former Representative Darrell Solberg and Jim Larson, who had run for the seat in 2010.

In 2014, Erickson ran for the at-large B seat of the Sioux Falls City Council, when Jim Entenman chose not to seek re-election. She defeated her Democratic challenger Denny Pierson by 17,489 votes (65%) to 9,470 (35%). She resigned her District 11 seat after the election, and her vacancy was filled by Willadsen, who was appointed by Governor of South Dakota, Dennis Daugaard, to finish her term. In 2018, she defeated Nick Weiland 67% to 33%.

References

External links
 

Living people
Republican Party members of the South Dakota House of Representatives
Politicians from Rapid City, South Dakota
Politicians from Sioux Falls, South Dakota
American people of English descent
American people of German descent
American people of Italian descent
University of Sioux Falls alumni
Women state legislators in South Dakota
1978 births
21st-century American politicians
21st-century American women politicians